Bobby Roberts (December 19, 1927 – June 22, 2002) was an American college basketball coach for Clemson University from 1962 to 1970.

Roberts played for Mars Hill Junior College (now Mars Hill University) and Furman. He joined Clemson in 1958 as an assistant and coach of the freshman team. He was promoted to head coach when Press Maravich left the Tigers to take an assistant coaching position under Everett Case at NC State.

Roberts coached the Tigers for eight seasons. He was the first coach in school history to lead the ram to consecutive winning seasons in the Atlantic Coast Conference (ACC), in 1965–66 and 1966–67. Roberts resigned his post with six regular-season games to go the 1969–70 season, to be effective at the end of the year. The team finished 7–19 in his last year. He was replaced by Tates Locke on March 18, 1970.

Roberts died on June 22, 2002 at age 74 at his home in Aiken, South Carolina.

Head coaching record

References

External links
 Coaching record @ sports-reference.com

1927 births
2002 deaths
American men's basketball coaches
American men's basketball players
Basketball coaches from South Carolina
Basketball players from South Carolina
Clemson Tigers men's basketball coaches
College men's basketball head coaches in the United States
Furman Paladins baseball players
Furman Paladins men's basketball players
High school basketball coaches in the United States
Junior college men's basketball players in the United States
Mars Hill University alumni
People from Laurens, South Carolina